Boonstra is a West Frisian toponymic surname, indicating an origin in the town of Oldeboorn or from near the river , after which the town was named. Notable people with the surname include:

 Albert Boonstra (born 1957), Dutch swimmer
 Clarence A. Boonstra (1914–2006), American ambassador
 Cor Boonstra (born 1938), Dutch chief executive
 Dirk Boonstra (1893–1944), Dutch police officer
 Dirk Boonstra (1920–1944), Dutch Resistance member
 Lieuwe Dirk Boonstra (1905–1975), South African paleontologist
 Miranda Boonstra (born 1972), Dutch long-distance runner
 Tjabel Boonstra (1899–1968), Dutch cyclist
 Todd Boonstra (born 1961), American cross-country skier

References

Surnames of Frisian origin
Toponymic surnames